WJKQ (88.5 FM) was a radio station licensed to serve Jackson, Michigan.  The station was owned by Great Lakes Community Broadcasting.

The station formerly aired a commercial-free Oldies format with some Christian religious programming; it was then off the air for several months but later returned to the air with the automated, commercial-free adult standards/oldies/light music feed from the Society for Accurate Information and Distribution (SAID) Foundation, with breaks for locally oriented community programming. It also broadcast public service programming from NASA, USDA, CDC, etc.

The station has been assigned these call letters by the Federal Communications Commission since May 8, 2003.

The station was in the process of being donated to the SAID Foundation pending FCC approval.  The SAID Foundation took over operations of the station in early 2008 and operated it under the name Foundation Radio, where community matters. In February 2012, it was announced that the station was being purchased by Jackson Lansing Catholic Radio for $14,000.

On June 13, 2012, the Federal Communications Commission announced that all licenses associated with Great Lakes Community Broadcasting, including WJKQ, has been cancelled, due to false claims that the group built a series of stations and repeaters. The cancellation of WJKQ's license has been retroactive to June 5, 2005. With this cancellation order, the FCC orders Great Lakes Community Broadcasting to cease operations of all its stations immediately.

References

JKQ
Radio stations disestablished in 2012
Radio stations established in 2003
2003 establishments in Michigan
2012 disestablishments in Michigan
Defunct radio stations in the United States
JKQ